Julio Kenny Donisa (born 15 January 1994) is a professional footballer who plays as a forward for Liga I club FC Argeș Pitești. Born in France, he formerly represented the Martinique national team before switching to represent the Madagascar national team.

Club career
Having arrived from Martinique, Donisa trained with CS Brétigny-sur-Orge and later played with the U19 team of FC Rouen. Having almost secured a move to Parma whilst at Rouen, a move which fell through over a disagreement about compensation due to the Brétigny club, he moved to Italy anyway, playing with Battipagliese and Fondi.

In 2015 he joined AS Pagny-sur Moselle after being involved in a training match organised by his agent. In his second season with the club he scored thirteen goals, and was signed by Concarneau to play in the Championnat National. 

Donisa was designated revelation of the Championnat National for the 2017–18 season, and earned a move to Red Star F.C., signing a two-year professional contract at the start of the 2018–19 season. 
On 27 July 2018, the first matchday of the 2018–19 season, Donisa made his Ligue 2 debut with Red Star in a 2–1 home defeat to Niort.

In January 2019, he was loaned to AS Lyon-Duchère from Red Star until the end of the season. Whilst at Lyon-Duchère he caught the eye of recruiters from Clermont Foot, and eventually signed a two-year contract with them in August 2019.

In June 2020, Donisa signed for Le Mans FC.

International career

Martinique
Donisa was born in France and is of Martiniquais and Réunionnais-Malagasy descent. He made his debut for the Martinique national football team in a 1–0 2019–20 CONCACAF Nations League qualifying win over Puerto Rico on 13 October 2018.

Madagascar
In May 2022, he was called up to represent the Madagascar national team. He debuted with Madagascar in a 3–0 2023 Africa Cup of Nations qualification loss to Ghana on 1 June 2022.

Career statistics

Scores and results list Madagascar's goal tally first, score column indicates score after each Donisa goal.

References

External links
 

Living people
1994 births
People from L'Haÿ-les-Roses
Footballers from Val-de-Marne
Malagasy footballers
Madagascar international footballers
Martiniquais footballers
Martinique international footballers
French footballers
Malagasy people of Martiniquais descent
French sportspeople of Malagasy descent
French people of Martiniquais descent
French people of Réunionnais descent
Dual internationalists (football)
Association football forwards
Ligue 2 players
Ligue 1 players
Championnat National players
Championnat National 3 players
S.S. Racing Club Fondi players
US Concarneau players
Red Star F.C. players
Lyon La Duchère players
Clermont Foot players
Le Mans FC players
FC Argeș Pitești players
Malagasy expatriate footballers
Expatriate footballers in Romania
Malagasy expatriate sportspeople in Romania
Black French sportspeople